Mahdi Bemani Naeini (also spelt Mehdi Bemani, Mehdi Bemani Naeini, born November 3, 1968) is an Iranian film director, cinematographer, TV news producer and photographer.

Early life

Bemani was born into an Iranian middle-class family in Mashad on November 3, 1968.
For the first time he touched camera at the age of ten when he developed and printed his first photos personally in his home made atelier. 
Throughout his early teens, Mahdi Bemani made amateur 8 mm movies with his family and friends. His films widely intended and presented in domestic and international film festivals and by the time he was 17, he gained many national and international prizes.
He graduated from IYCS, Iranian Young Cinema Society in 1984 where he experienced film making and photography systematically.

Career
Independent producer and filmmaker.

Awars

Filmography
 Hazrate Amirjon (Mir Sayyid Ali Hamadani), (2015), documentary film
 EID-AL-ADHA in Tajikistan, (2015), documentary film
 Gour Ghooli Epic, (2015), documentary film 
 Nowrouz in Tajikistan , (2014), documentary film 
 Maria, (2012), documentary film 
 Bashara Mausoleum, (2010), documentary film.  
 Vivaldi Azalia (2010), music video 
 Beads of Memories (2010), documentary film. 
 Maroon Town in Dushanbe (2009), documentary film. 
 Documents of a letter (2008), documentary film. 
 Breeze of Moulian River (2008), documentary film. 
 My prospect (2007), music video. 
 Kindness (2007), music video. 
 Rumi's dance (2007), music video. 
 Time contrast (2006), documentary film. 
 Re-reading (2005), documentary film. 
 Un Amore Grande (2005, Language: Italian), music video. 
 City of God (2004), music video. 
 Pendulum (2002) 
 One Two Three (2002), animation. 
 One day for all (2001), animation. 
 Straggle (2001), animation. 
 Cross Country (2000), animation. 
 Holiday (1998), documentary film. 
 Nowruz (1998), documentary film. 
 Smell of Wheat (1993), documentary film. 
 Statue (1993), documentary film. 
 Dream (1992) 
 Those days (1991) 
 To the dust again (1988) 
 Teacher's lesson (1985) 
 Silence (1985) 
 Ascent (1984)

References
 Photographic Society of America :

External links

Official Website
Geographic_Photo Contest 2013
Smith Sonian
National Geographic_Photo Contest 2012
ECO Cultural Institute
News
Short Film News
Iranian Database of Animation
Keyhan International, Keyhan Group Newspapers
Aftab News

Living people
1968 births